Women's chess in Australia has been occurring since the 1930s and competitive chess tournaments in Australia were taking place on a state level by 1934.

History
During the 1930s, women were encouraged to play chess because the sport was not seen as a bridge to gambling. In 1940, a study of 314 women in New Zealand and Australia was done. Most of the women in the study were middle class, conservative, Protestant and white. The study found that 183 participated in sport.  The ninth most popular sport that these women participated in was chess, with 3 having played the sport. The sport was tied with croquet, billiards, chess, fishing, field hockey, horse racing, squash, table tennis and shooting.

Competitive chess
There were chess championships for women being organised by the 1940s. A New South Wales's women's championship was held in 1936, 1939 and 1941.

Competitors
As at January 2015, the following players are the top FIDE rated Australian female players:
 Giang Nguyen, WFM
 Irina Berezina, IM is an Australian Women's Chess Champion, and has represented the country in international competitions. 
 Heather Richards, WIM
 Arianne Caoili, WIM
 Biljana Dekic, WIM

Other top Australian female chess players, who are no longer regular tournament competitors, include Arianne Caoili (died 2020), Katrin Aladjova, Laura Moylan, Daniela Nutu-Gajic, and Ngan Phan-Koshnitsky.

Australian Women's Champions
The Australian Women's Chess Championship has not been held since 1999 due to lack of interest by the Australian Chess Federation and the top women players of the time. The title of Australian Women's Champion is now awarded to the top finishing woman in the biennial Australian Open, subject to conditions being met.

2023 Leah Rice
2019 Julia Ryjanova
2017 Alexandra Jule
2015 Heather Richards
2003 Slavica Sarai
2002 Narelle Szuveges
1999 Irina Feldman
1998 Ngan Phan-Koshnitsky
1996 Biljana Dekic & Ngan Phan-Koshnitsky
1995 Daniela Nutu-Gajic
1992 Katrin Aladjova-Wills
1990 Josie Wright
1988 Carin Craig
1986 Josie Wright
1984 Anne Slavotinek
1982 Anne Slavotinek
1980 Marion McGrath
1978 Lynda Pope
1976 Marion McGrath
1974 Narelle Kellner
1972 Narelle Kellner
1969 Marion McGrath
1966 Marion McGrath

See also

References

Bibliography

Chess
Women's chess
Chess in Australia